Puerto Rican duo Wisin & Yandel has released ten studio albums, three live albums, four collaboration albums, four compilation albums, 35 singles and 48 music videos.

Albums

Studio albums

Live albums

Compilations

Remix albums

Singles

As lead artists

Notes

As featured artists

Other charted, certified and promotional songs

Album appearances
The following songs are not singles and have not appeared on an album by Wisin & Yandel.

Notes
Although the U.S. Billboard Hot 100 chart comprise up to a hundred songs, the Bubbling Under Hot 100 Singles act as an extension to each chart. Thus, songs that have peaked up to these extension charts are listed in this discography under the Hot 100 with values over a hundred.

Collaborations/Remixes

Filmography
 2003: Mi Vida
 2011: Revolución

Music videos

Notes

References

Discographies of Puerto Rican artists
Reggaeton discographies